Thayer Glacier is in the U.S. state of Oregon. It is on the east slopes of North Sister, an extinct shield volcano.

In August 2020 the Oregon Glaciers Institute reported that Thayer Glacier no longer has active, moving ice.

See also
 List of glaciers in the United States

References

Glaciers of Oregon
Glaciers of Deschutes County, Oregon